George B. Dovey (April 18, 1862 – June 19, 1909) was the principal owner of the Boston Doves of the National League from  through .

History
Dovey was born in Pottsville, Pennsylvania; he attended college in Kentucky, where he played baseball.  For several years he worked as a salesman for the St. Louis Car Company.

In 1907, Dovey bought the Boston Beaneaters from Arthur Soden, becoming the team's principal owner; he then renamed the team the Boston Doves.

At the age of 46, Dovey died of a pulmonary hemorrhage, early in the morning of June 19, 1909 while riding a Pennsylvania Railroad train in Greene County, Ohio, between Cedarville and Xenia.  He was buried in Mount Moriah Cemetery, Philadelphia.

Following his death, his brother John became principal owner of the franchise.

References

1862 births
1909 deaths
American salespeople
Baseball executives
Baseball players from Pennsylvania
Boston Braves (baseball)
Burials at Mount Moriah Cemetery (Philadelphia)
Deaths from pulmonary hemorrhage
Sportspeople from Pottsville, Pennsylvania
19th-century American businesspeople